The Tripura Legislative Assembly or Tripura Vidhan Sabha is the unicameral legislature of the Indian state of Tripura, with 60 Members of the Legislative Assembly. The present Assembly is located in Gurkhabasti. Ujjayanta Palace in Agartala served as the previous meeting place. The tenure of the Assembly is five years unless sooner dissolved. The present Assembly is the 13th Legislative Assembly, where the current speaker of the House is yet to be elected. On 15 August 1957, a Territorial Council was formed with 30 elected members and two members nominated by the Government of India.

Previous Assemblies
The assemblies constituted so far are listed below:

Members of Legislative Assembly

References

External links
Tripura Lok Sabha Election Result Website
Official government website of Tripura

 
State legislatures of India
Unicameral legislatures
1963 establishments in Tripura